Jarosław Duda (born 29 April 1964) is a Polish politician. He was elected to the Sejm on 25 September 2005, getting 5,901 votes in 3 Wrocław district as a candidate from the Civic Platform list.

See also
Members of Polish Sejm; 2005–2007

References

External links

Senate page

Members of the Polish Sejm 2005–2007
Members of the Polish Sejm 2001–2005
Civic Platform politicians
1964 births
Living people
MEPs for Poland 2019–2024